JTI may refer to:

 Japan Tobacco International
 Join the Impact, an American LGBT political movement
 Journal of Japanese Trade & Industry, now called Japan Spotlight
 Journal of Theological Interpretation
 Jubail Technical Institute, in Saudi Arabia
 Jungian Type Indicator, a psychometric questionnaire to assess personality types
 University of Virginia Japanese Text Initiative
 Veermata Jijabai Technological Institute, formerly Victoria Jubilee Technical Institute, Mumbai